Sultan Djabir (or Bokoyo, born  – 11 January 1918) was ruler of a region on the Uele River in what is now the Democratic Republic of the Congo.
He engaged in the ivory and slave trade with Muslims from the north and with Belgians from the south.
Eventually he was forced to flee to the Sudan when he refused to pay tribute to the Congo Free State.

Early years

Bokoyo was a paramount chief of the Bandia people, son of Dwaro and grandson of Hiro, born around 1855.
He first settled near the Dume River, a tributary of the Mbomou River.
De Bauw says that when he was 14 years old he wanted to travel.
An Arab caravan let him follow them north to Khartoum, where he stayed for three months.
According to de la Kethulle, he was a sincere Muslim who fasted and prayed during Ramadan.
He also adopted Arabic dress.

Around 1875, Bokoyo had to flee his father's residence and took refuge with Swa, son of Gaia, son of Gatanga, son of Ino, who kept him in detention for fear of his intrigues.
Bokoyo escaped and settled in the territory of Gezere, a Nubian who represented the Sudanese slave trader Al-Zubayr Rahma Mansur.
He took the Muslim name of Djabir, and travelled with Gezere to Khartoum.
He returned from Khartoum with the Arab Kabasi, then guided the Arab Alikobbo to the Bili River basin and towards the lower Uelé River.

In 1884 the agents of the Egyptian government withdrew to Bahr el Ghazal to support Frank Lupton, who was cut off by the Mahdists.
Djabir followed Alikobbo part of the way, then took his people, arms and ammunition and installed himself between the Angoli river and the territory of Ngia, his brother.
Abdallah, a lieutenant of Alikobbo, remained at Bomu.
Djabir attacked and defeated him on the Dume River.
Taking Adballah's arms, Djabir moved south and settled on the Zagiri and Mamboya, tributaries that enter the Uelé River from the north.
Sultan Rafai returned from Bahr el Ghazal where he had been fighting the Mahdists and settled at the Mago, downstream from Djabir.
He did not trust Djabir, and imprisoned him for two years from 1886 to 1888.
Djabir managed to escape, and after some maneuvering between the two sultans and their Arab allies Rafai moved to the north while Djabir contacted the Europeans at Basoko.

European contact (1889–90)

Jérôme Becker met Sultan Djabir at Basoko in December 1889, and in January 1890 reached Djabir's sultanate. 
Later in 1890 an expedition led by Léon Roget with Jules Alexandre Milz and Joseph Duvivier established the Ibembo station on the Itimbiri River and the Ekwangatana post.
On 25 May 1890 they crossed the Likati and on 27 May 1890 reached the Uele River opposite Sultan Djabar's village of Djabir (now called Bondo).
Sultan Djabir signed a treaty with Milz and a post was established on the site of the former Egyptian zeriba of Deleb.

Milz began construction of the station while Roget, guided by Sultan Djabir, tried unsuccessfully to join Alphonse van Gèle in Yakoma.
Roget had gone north as far as Mbili and Gangu, having heard that the country downstream was too dangerous.
On 9 June 1890 he returned to Djabir.
Roget left Djabir in July to return to Basoko, the Pool and Boma, leaving Milz in command with instructions to attempt the liaison with Yakoma.
In July–August 1890 Milz and his assistant Mahutte and Sultan Djabir led 100 fusiliers and 400 lancers in an attempt to push through the non-submissive people along the right bank, but were forced to return to Djabir after nine days.
Milz and van Gèle finally made contact on 3 December 1890, confirming that the Uelé was the upper portion of the Ubangi.

Djabir became an officer in the Force Publique and was paid an annual salary.
Clément-François Vande Vliet described Djabir as he was in October 1891,

Slave and ivory trade

In December 1891 Sultan Djabir sold the Congo Free State 156 adult slaves and 65 children.
Due to harsh treatment by the Belgians, few of them survived.
Djabir sold hundreds of slaves to the state at a rate of 10 men for one musket, raiding the neighboring villages to obtain men to serve in the Force Publique.
He and other sultans in the region traded with Belgian concessionaries such as the Société des Sultanats, selling ivory and slaves in return for guns and ammunition.
The sultans also sold slaves and ivory to Muslims from the Wadaï and other places to the north, receiving goods such as guns, salt, cattle and cloth in exchange.
The local chiefs would bring ivory and slaves to the town of Djabir, selling them inside the sultan's court, which was off-limits to Europeans.

Last years

Marcus Dorman visited Djabir in 1904.
He wrote,

In 1905 the Congo Free State attacked Djabir, who had to flee to French territory to the north.
Although the Free State had known about Djabir's illicit trading, the Belgians tolerated it until he refused to pay tribute.
He settled in the Sudan near Deim Zubeir.
He died there on 11 January 1918.

Notes

Citations

Sources

1855 births
1918 deaths
Congo Free State people